First Lady of Palau is the official title attributed to the wife of the president of Palau. The country's current first lady is Valerie Whipps, wife of President Surangel Whipps Jr., who had held the position since 21 January 2021.

First ladies of Palau

References

Palau
Palauan women in politics